Jim Bollman (born December 1, 1954) is a retired American college football coach and former player. He is the former offensive line coach at Michigan State University,  Prior to that he was the offensive line coach at Boston College from January 2012-February 27, 2013.  Previously, Bollman served as the offensive coordinator and offensive line coach at Ohio State University from 2001 to 2011.

Coaching career

Michigan State
Bollman accepted the offensive line coaching job at Purdue for the 2013 season, when he bolted to Michigan State to become their co-offensive coordinator. Bollman helped guide the Spartans to a 13-1 record, including a Big Ten Conference Championship and a Rose Bowl Game victory.

References

External links
 Michigan State profile

1954 births
Living people
American football offensive linemen
Boston College Eagles football coaches
Chicago Bears coaches
Michigan State Spartans football coaches
Ohio Bobcats football players
Ohio State Buckeyes football coaches
Miami RedHawks football coaches
NC State Wolfpack football coaches
Philadelphia Eagles coaches
Virginia Cavaliers football coaches
Youngstown State Penguins football coaches
Sportspeople from Ashtabula, Ohio